Qianwei County is a county in the central part of Sichuan Province, China. It is under the administration of Leshan City.

Climate

References

 
County-level divisions of Sichuan
Leshan